Muwatalli or Mutawallis may refer to:

Muwatalli II (c. 1295–1272 BCE) Hittite emperor
Muwatalli I, 15th century Hittite ruler
Muwatalli (Kummuh), 8th century Neo-Hittite ruler
Muwatalli I (Gurgum), 10th century Neo-Hittite ruler
Muwatalli II (Gurgum), 9th century Neo-Hittite ruler
Muwatalli III (Gurgum), 8th century Neo-Hittite ruler